Kathryn Jane Campbell,  is a senior Australian public servant and a former senior officer in the Australian Army Reserve. She was the Secretary of the Department of Human Services from March 2011 to September 2017. She is noted for her involvement in the development and execution of an illegal debt recovery scheme known as the Robodebt which has since attracted international attention, a class action lawsuit, and a Royal Commission.  

After this role Campbell moved onto the Secretary of the Department of Social Services from September 2017 to July 2021.

As robodebt crisis deepened and the election loomed, Campbell was moved across to Secretary of the Department of Foreign Affairs and Trade from July 2021 to July 2022.

In July 2022, Campbell was appointed to the defence portfolio as an advisor to the AUKUS program. She retained the conditions of employment, such as remuneration, of her previous secretary role. It was widely reported that she was ousted from her former DFAT role after just 12 months, as recommended by Minister Penny Wong. 

On 4 June 2018, Campbell was announced as the next commander of the 2nd Division on promotion to major general.  She became the first woman to be appointed to the role of commander of the 2nd Division.

In 2017 Campbell was summoned to an Australian Senate committee inquiry into the illegal debt recovery system, commonly referred to as Robodebt. Campbell was quoted as shifting blame to victims of Robodebt that "they had not engaged" with Centrelink and thus this was the reason for false calculations and ongoing debt chasing for over 500,000 Australians, all of whom have since had their debts removed and voided. A class-action lawsuit was brought against the Australian government which resulted in a $1.7 Billion settlement. The settlement is the largest ever settlement in Australia's history.

Career
Between 2005 and 2010, Campbell was Deputy Secretary of the Budget and Financial Management Groups in the Department of Finance and Deregulation, and from 2010 to 2011, Campbell was a Deputy Secretary in the Department of Education, Employment and Workplace Relations.

Prime Minister Julia Gillard announced Campbell's appointment as Secretary of the Department of Human Services (DHS) in late December 2010, responsible for delivering the Australian Government's Centrelink, Medicare and Child Support programs, along with a number of smaller programs. Campbell commenced those duties on 7 March 2011.

On 7 September 2017, Prime Minister Malcolm Turnbull announced Campbell's appointment as Secretary of the Department of Social Services, commencing 18 September.

On 9 July 2021, Prime Minister Scott Morrison announced her appointment as the Secretary of the Department of Foreign Affairs and Trade (DFAT), replacing Frances Adamson. In June 2022, new Prime Minister Anthony Albanese announced that Campbell would be replaced as Secretary of DFAT, with her term concluding on 1 July 2022. Campbell would instead be given "a senior appointment in the Defence portfolio in an AUKUS-related role". Campbell’s removal as DFAT Secretary was described in the media as “being ousted in a public service shakeup”.  Further, the removal of Campbell was widely anticipated, especially given her performance in questioning at Senate estimates, by Senator Penny Wong, who became Minister for Foreign Affairs under the newly elected Labor government.  It was also clear that Campbell’s central role in the Robodebt controversy was a major concern and Labor had made an election pledge to launch a royal commission into the discredited scheme.

Robodebt (Centrelink debt recovery controversy)
Beginning in 2016, Centrelink became embroiled in a debt recovery controversy. The controversy stemmed from the Online Compliance Program, which was commonly referred to as Robodebt.

The Robodebt scandal has been described in the media as the "defining controversy" of Campbell's public service career. As Secretary DHS, she was clearly identified in the 2015 auditor-general’s report.  She has also been clearly a focus of the Robodebt Royal Commission.  

The process and algorithm for matching welfare recipients' records against data from the Australian Tax Office began in 2004 and remained unchanged until the Online Compliance Program began.

Appearing before a Senate committee inquiry into the program in March 2017, Campbell stated "The view of the department is that there are a number of refinements that need to be made—those refinements are being made—and that the system should continue."

Leading Australian political commentator, Jack Waterford, reported 10 March 2017 on Campbell’s appearance before the Senate Committee inquiry and placed considerable blame on Campbell, "But in fierce loyalty to ministers she has denied any staffing pressures – and implicitly any need for her agency to go unready into the robo-debt system as a way of making up for staff losses. It was the department, not the minister, that decided it was ready, when it was not. It was the department that decided to implement a deeply flawed computer program with processes completely at odds with public service values of welfare delivery.”  Furthermore, he reported on Campbell’s roles in Robodebt  in “creating and presiding over it, and refusal to acknowledge its flaws”.  Waterford went on to comment in the article that “Ministers do not get down to that level of administration. They rely on their departments. Public service leaders of the calibre the community has a right to expect – especially given their $700,000-plus salaries – should have resisted the pressures until the system was ready. Campbell's real problem is she put pleasing ministers ahead of duty to the public, the public interest and public service values.”

At a Senate hearing in July 2020, Campbell claimed not to know what Robodebt meant and denied that people had died by suicide as a result of receiving the unlawful automated debt recovery notices.

On 18 August 2022, the Governor-General issued the Letters Patent, which established the Royal Commission into the Robodebt Scheme. The Royal Commission's final report is to be delivered by 18 April 2023.

Campbell’s initial testimonies to the Royal Commission  in November and December, 2022  admitted to her “lack of curiosity” over advice related to the legality of the robodebt scheme.  Acknowledged as being the key public servant responsible for leading the implementation of the robodebt program, Campbell admitted in her testimony on 11 November, 2022 that  the scheme was a significant failure of public administration, refusing to consider it as a massive failure. Campbell put blame on DSS, under the Secretary Finn Pratt, who was responsible for providing advice.  However, Pratt, advised that it was not his responsibility and it rested with DHS: “But at this time, because this was a measure produced by another department, which was independent of my department.  This was one headache, which wasn’t my headache.”In her third and final testimony on 7 March, 2023, Campbell admitted it was her Department's "significant oversight" that led to cabinet being misled, but she denied it was deliberate.

Former Secretary of DHS, Renee Leon took over the DHS role from Campbell in September 2017.  Her evidence to the Royal Commission included her reporting of the unlawfulness of the scheme to the Minister, Stuart Robert and that she stopped the scheme.  She described “the deep cultural problems at senior levels at the department when she took over from Campbell” and how staff were very fearful of Campbell and “the reward and punishment culture” that prevailed. Leon testified that there were wider cultural problems within the department included aggression and public shaming promoted by Campbell.  Leon told the inquiry of how she previously had a "collegiate" relationship with Ms Campbell.  However, she soon became aware that Campbell was deliberately undermining her with Robert, the then responsible Minister.  Leon described the conduct of Campbell and other senior officials as malfeasance.  Notably, Campbell’s successor, Leon testified that her predecessor “took credit” for the Robodebt scheme.  Leon testified that Campbell was “rewarded” for being more responsive to the coalition government’s policy agenda than other department secretaries, and that she, and many others, believed that Campbell’s elevation to the role of the secretary of the Department of Foreign Affairs and Trade “was a very big reward for someone who had no background in diplomacy.”

Timothy Ffrench, who was chief counsel at DHS, testified that Campbell was largely to blame for a culture that meant the robodebt scheme’s legality was not checked earlier.  Ffrench further testified that he also advised the then DHS secretary, Leon, on 17 November 2019 of her exposure to a claim of misfeasance in public office if the scheme continued. Ffrench said Leon suspended the scheme the day after he sent her that advice, on 18 November, 2023. 

Louise Macleod, a former Senior Assistant Ombudsman, testified that in the undertaking of the Ombudsman's investigation, she felt that DHS had “misled” her through it not providing her with crucial documents that suggested the scheme was unlawful. It has been speculated that the failure to provide those documents to the Ombudsman investigation was a direction from DHS Secretary Campbell. Testimonies from the then acting Ombudsman, Richard Glenn, and the current Ombudsman Iain Anderson, confirmed that DHS under Campbell deliberately misled the Ombudsman's investigations by withholding key documents that flagged issues with the scheme's legality.

Awards
Campbell's awards include:

 University of Southern Queensland 2011 Alumnus of the Year. 
 Conspicuous Service Cross (CSC) in June 2010 for outstanding achievement as the Commanding Officer of the Sydney University Regiment, 
 Appointed an Officer of the Order of Australia in the 2019 Australia Day Honours in recognition of her "distinguished service to public administration through senior roles with government departments, and to the Australian Army Reserve", 
 Awarded a Bar to her CSC in the 2022 Australia Day Honours for "outstanding achievement as the Commander of the 2nd Division".

References

Living people
Year of birth missing (living people)
Place of birth missing (living people)
Australian generals
Australian public servants
Recipients of the Conspicuous Service Cross (Australia)
Officers of the Order of Australia